George Burden (died 1593) of Westminster, was an English politician.

Family and education
Burden was educated at Magdalen Hall, Oxford and Trinity College, Cambridge. He was a fellow of Trinity in 1546, and graduated with a BA c. 1548. He married Elizabeth Prestwood.

Career
He was a Member (MP) of the Parliament of England for Aylesbury in 1572.

References

Year of birth missing
1593 deaths
Fellows of Trinity College, Cambridge
Alumni of Trinity College, Cambridge
Alumni of Magdalen Hall, Oxford
People from Westminster
English MPs 1572–1583